Rabbi Menachem Mendel Chitrik (born March 31, 1977), better known as Rabbi Mendy Chitrik, is an American, Israeli, and Turkish Rabbi of the Ashkenazi Jewish community of Turkey since 2003. He became the chairman of the Alliance of Rabbis in Islamic States in 2019.

Biography 
Rabbi Chitrik grew up in Safed, to a Chassidic family; his great grandfather was Rabbi Yehuda Chitrik. He studied in the Chabad Yeshiva system, at the Rabbinical College of America (Bachelor of Religious Studies) and in Colel Tzemach Tzedek in Jerusalem.  He received his rabbinical ordination from Rabbi Zalman Nechemia Goldberg of Jerusalem, the Sefardi Chief Rabbis of Israel Mordechai Eliyahu and Eliyahu Bakshi-Doron, and from his maternal grandfather Chief Rabbi David Moshe Lieberman, the Chief Rabbi of Antwerp.

Public life 
Chitrik moved to Istanbul, Turkey in 2001, and in 2003 became the Rabbi of the Ashkenazi Jewish community of Turkey, a small and ancient community that has existed for centuries and predates the much larger and more famous Sephardi community whose members settled in Istanbul mostly after the expulsion from Spain. 

In 2019, Chitrik was elected the Chairman of ARIS (Alliance of Rabbis in Islamic States), an alliance of rabbis living in the Muslim world. He previously served as a permanent member of the Standing Committee of the Conference of European Rabbis (CER) 2014-2020 until his appointment as chairman of the Alliance of Rabbis in Islamic States. He is a member of the RCA and other rabbinical bodies. Chitrik belongs to the Chabad movement; he has been outspoken against Chabad Messianism.

Chitrik is involved with interfaith activities focusing on Jewish-Muslim relations. He travels extensively and writes about the history of Jews in Anatolia. His travels across Anatolia in Summer of 2021 were widely reported.

As part of his responsibilities in the Jewish community of Turkey, Chitrik leads the KTR, Turkey's Chief Rabbinate's Kashrut department for exports (Denet Gida). 

He is also responsible for the Kosher standards at the  Emirati Agency for Kosher Certification (EAKC). He is also a field representative for the OU and other major kosher organizations, a shochet, Sofer and a mohel.

Rabbi Chitrik supervised the Kosher Kitchen at the 2022 FIFA World Cup in Qatar. 

Chitrik and his wife Chaya (nee Schochet, married 2000) have been involved in strengthening the Jewish life and Jewish learning in Istanbul through classes, large scale Jewish holiday events, one-on-one counseling, daily prayer services. With their eight children, they run an open house in Istanbul, where local residents and travelers from all over the world come on Shabbat and holidays. 

Some of the activities have been criticized by the more secular elements of the community.

Publications 
Chitrik has published several books on Jewish life in Turkish, and was involve in publishing a book on Turkish-Sephardic customs. Chitrik is fluent in six languages, including Ladino. He lectures on the history and customs of Turkish Jews.

Podcast 
In October 2021, Chitrik started a podcast with his cousin Rabbi Eliezer Zalmanov of Munster, IN, titled "Chatting Rabbis," an unscripted weekly conversation about the many issues facing their families, their communities, and the Jewish world at large.

References

External links

Social media 
https://twitter.com/mchitrik
https://www.facebook.com/AskTheRabbi
https://www.linkedin.com/in/mendy-chitrik

1977 births
Living people
Chabad-Lubavitch rabbis
Israeli Orthodox rabbis
Turkish rabbis